Barbuto is an Italian restaurant owned by Jonathan Waxman located in the West Village of Manhattan, New York City, on Washington Street.  The original Location closed after 15 years when it lost its lease in 2019. They reopened in the autumn of 2021 at 113 Horatio Street. The new location actually opened in February 2020 but three weeks later they were forced to shut down due to the COVID-19 pandemic.

The restaurant originally opened in February 2004 and their signature dish is roast chicken with salsa verde.

Awards and honors
Waxman won a James Beard Award for Best Chef NYC in 2016 based on his work at Barbuto.

New York Magazine has called it a “pioneering farm-to-table-y Italian restaurant.“

References

Italian restaurants in New York City
Restaurants established in  2004
Restaurants in Manhattan
West Village